Raynald Joseph Albert Guay (31 March 1933 – 26 January 2017) was a Canadian politician. Guay served as a Liberal party member of the House of Commons of Canada. Born in Lauzon, Quebec, he was a lawyer by career.

He represented the Lévis, Quebec electoral district which he first won in the 1963 federal election. After successive re-elections there in 1965, 1968, 1972, 1974, 1979 and 1980 federal elections, he resigned from national politics on 29 August 1980 to accept an appointment to the Anti-Dumping Tribunal. Guay served full terms from the 27th to the 31st Canadian Parliaments and for the initial months of the 32nd Canadian Parliament. He died on 26 January 2017.

Electoral record

References

External links
 
CBC: Canada Votes 2006: riding profile, reference to Guay's resignation

1933 births
2017 deaths
Members of the House of Commons of Canada from Quebec
Liberal Party of Canada MPs